"The Stones I Throw (Will Free All Men)" is a single by Levon and the Hawks, released in 1965 on Atco Records. It was their first release under this name, following their previous single under the name Canadian Squires. Seemingly a comment by Robbie Robertson in favor of the Civil Rights Movement, the song is carried by Garth Hudson's organ, and is far less rooted in the heavy R&B stylings of the group's other three single sides. It is the link between their days with Ronnie Hawkins and the group's breakout 1968 LP, Music from Big Pink.  In December, 1965 the song reached #22 on the CHUM Chart.

Cover versions
The song was covered by J.J. Jackson and included on his debut album released in 1967, and by the group Ocean, who included it on their 1970 debut album, Put Your Hand in the Hand.

Personnel
The Band
Rick Danko - bass, vocals
Levon Helm - drums, vocals
Garth Hudson - organ
Richard Manuel - piano, vocals
Jaime Robbie Robertson - guitar, harmonica
Technical
Henry Glover - producer
Phil Ramone - engineer

References

1965 songs
1965 singles
The Band songs
Songs written by Robbie Robertson
Atco Records singles